The 2015–16 Rain or Shine Elasto Painters season was the tenth season of the franchise in the Philippine Basketball Association (PBA).

Key dates
August 23: The 2015 PBA draft took place at Midtown Atrium, Robinson Place Manila.

Draft picks

Roster

  also serves as Rain or Shine's board governor.

Philippine Cup

Eliminations

Standings

Game log

Playoffs

Bracket

Commissioner's Cup

Eliminations

Standings

Game log

Playoffs

Bracket

Governors' Cup

Eliminations

Standings

Transactions

Free agency

Trades
Off-season

Governor's Cup

Recruited imports

References

Rain or Shine Elasto Painters seasons
Rain or Shine